Nick Ward is a British physician and expert on smallpox. He worked in Botswana before having lead roles during the World Health Organization's smallpox eradication programme in Bangladesh and was the first coordinator of the Global Polio Eradication Initiative.

References 

Living people
Year of birth missing (living people)
Year of birth unknown